Valérie is a 1969 black-and-white Canadian film directed by Denis Héroux. It was the first Quebec film to show nudity. It turned an unprecedented gross of $1.68 million, making it the highest-grossing Canadian film of its time.

Plot

Danielle Ouimet upon leaving a convent with the leader of a motorcycle gang, discovers the hippie culture of Montreal and turns to prostitution. This improbable storyline, made famous by the frank display of nudity and sexuality, came from a culture that was still labouring under a strong sense of Catholic guilt. It was the first of a group of films known as maple-syrup porn.

Production
Valérie was filmed in August and September 1968, with a budget of $99,000.

Release
The film was released in Montreal on 2 May 1969, by Cinépix, the producer and distributor. It was the highest-grossing of all-time in Canada with a gross of $1,684,000 and earned $2 million after being shown in forty countries. It was the most attended Quebec film since Little Aurore's Tragedy. The film was seen by 153,734 people in France.

See also
Nudity in film

References

Works cited

External links

1969 films
Canadian drama films
Films directed by Denis Héroux
Films shot in Montreal
1969 drama films
Canadian black-and-white films
Films produced by John Dunning
French-language Canadian films
1960s Canadian films
Canadian pornographic films
Canadian sexploitation films